The Deed of Paksenarrion is an epic fantasy saga by the American author Elizabeth Moon. The Deed of Paksenarrion was originally published in three volumes in 1988 and 1989 and as a single trade edition of that name in 1992 by Baen. The three books included are Sheepfarmer's Daughter, Divided Allegiance and Oath of Gold. Sheepfarmer's Daughter was awarded the Compton Crook Award by the Baltimore Science Fiction Society for the author's first fantasy novel.

A single volume prequel about the life of Paksenarrion's guiding saint was published in 1990, followed by a sequel tying characters from both works together.

A new series is set immediately after The Deed of Paksenarrion: it includes five volumes, released in 2010, 2011, 2012, 2013 and 2014.

Publications
The original trilogy and the two Gird-related books were first published as mass market paperbacks, before being collected as trade paperback omnibus editions. The new series is being published in hardcover.

The Deed of Paksenarrion
 The Deed of Paksenarrion omnibus (February 1992), hardcover (October 2003)
 Sheepfarmer’s Daughter (June 1988)
 Divided Allegiance (October 1988)
 Oath of Gold (January 1989)
 “Those Who Walk in Darkness” (March 1990) – short story set during Oath of Gold, included in the collections Lunar Activity and Phases

The Legacy of Gird
 The Legacy of Gird (published as A Legacy of Honour in the UK) omnibus (September 1996)
 Surrender None (June 1990) – prequel to The Deed of Paksenarrion
 Liar's Oath (May 1992) – sequel to both Surrender None and The Deed of Paksenarrion

Paladin's Legacy
 Oath of Fealty (March 2010)
 Kings of the North (March 2011)
 Echoes of Betrayal (March 2012)
 Limits of Power (June 2013)
 Crown of Renewal (May 2014)

Synopsis
The Deed of Paksenarrion was written as one long story, but published as three separate books.

The Deed of Paksenarrion revolves around the adult life of Paksenarrion Dorthansdotter, known as Paks, of Three Firs. It takes place in a fictional medieval world of kingdoms of humans, dwarves, gnomes and elves.

The story begins by introducing Paks as a headstrong girl of 18, who leaves her home in Three Firs (fleeing a marriage arranged by her father) to join a mercenary company and through her journeys and hardships comes to realize that she has been gifted as a paladin, if in a rather non-traditional way.  Paksenarrion works, fights, and sacrifices herself until she can see the rightful king of Lyonya established over the opposition of evil forces, or gods, and evil humans.

Film adaptation
As of December of 2019 Warner Bros. purchased the film rights to the books and plan on production of a live-action feature film.

References

External links
 The Legend of Paksenarrion at Elizabethmoon.com
 The Paksenarrion World Chronicles

Fantasy novel series
Novels by Elizabeth Moon
High fantasy novels
Fictional women soldiers and warriors